The Bickford Formation is a geologic formation of Early Cretaceous (Valanginian) age in the Western Canada Sedimentary Basin that consists primarily of nonmarine sediments. It is present in the northern foothills of the Canadian Rockies in northeastern British Columbia.

Lithology
The Bickford Formation consists of carbonaceous mudstone, shale, siltstone, sandstone, and thin coal seams. The sandstones are typically fine-grained, brown, finely laminated, cross-bedded, and thin bedded to flaggy. Some are extremely finely laminated, black, carbonaceous, limonitic, and weather to an orange-brown color. The interbedded shales and mudstones are dark olive brown to black and commonly carbonaceous. Coal seams are typically thin, although some may reach thicknesses of a few meters locally.

Environment of deposition
The Bickford Formation was deposited in nonmarine environments adjacent to the Western Interior Seaway. Depositional settings include deltaic, coastal plain, floodplain, and swamp environments.

Paleontology
Species of the bivalve Buchia and a variety of palynomorphs and microfossils have been described from the Bickford Creek Formation.

Thickness and distribution
The Bickford Formation is present in the foothills of the Canadian Rockies in northeastern British Columbia. It extends from the Halfway River in the north to the Sukunka River in the south where it grades into the Gorman Creek Formation.

Relationship to other units
The Bickford Formation forms the upper part of the Minnes Group. It conformably overlies the Monach Formation and is unconformably overlain by the Cadomin Formation. To the south it grades into the upper part of the Gorman Creek Formation. Equivalent beds are not present in the plains to the east.

References

See also

 List of fossiliferous stratigraphic units in British Columbia
 

Geologic formations of Canada
Valanginian Stage
Cretaceous British Columbia
Stratigraphy of British Columbia